Washington Díaz (born 20 July 1954) is a Uruguayan former cyclist. He competed in the three events at the 1976 Summer Olympics.

References

External links
 

1954 births
Living people
Uruguayan male cyclists
Olympic cyclists of Uruguay
Cyclists at the 1976 Summer Olympics
People from Maldonado, Uruguay